George Ernest Waldo (January 11, 1851 – June 16, 1942) was a U.S. Representative from New York.

Born in Brooklyn, New York, Waldo attended the public schools of Scotland, Connecticut, and Brooklyn, New York, Doctor Fitch's Academy, South Windham, Connecticut, Natchaug High School, Willimantic, Connecticut, and studied two years in Cornell University, Ithaca, New York, class of 1872. He studied law in New York City.

He was admitted to the bar in Poughkeepsie, New York, in 1876 and practiced in New York City 1876–1883 and in Ulysses, Nebraska from 1883 to 1889. Village attorney of Ulysses, Nebraska, for several years. For four years a member of the board of trustees and school director of Ulysses High School.

He returned to New York City in 1889. He was a member of the New York State Assembly (Kings Co., 18th D.) in 1896. He served as commissioner of records of Kings County, New York from 1899 to 1904. He served as delegate to the Republican National Convention in 1900.

Waldo was elected as a Republican to the Fifty-ninth and Sixtieth Congresses (March 4, 1905 – March 3, 1909). He was not a candidate for renomination in 1908. He resumed the practice of law in New York City. He moved to Los Angeles, California, in 1913, to Pasadena, California, in 1918, and continued the practice of his profession. He died in Pasadena, California on June 16, 1942. He remains were cremated and the ashes deposited in the New Cemetery, Scotland, Connecticut.

Legacy and honors
The World War II Liberty Ship  was named in his honor.

References

1851 births
1942 deaths
People from Brooklyn
People from Scotland, Connecticut
People from Pasadena, California
People from Butler County, Nebraska
Republican Party members of the United States House of Representatives from New York (state)